Hailanjiang Stadium (Simplified Chinese: 海兰江体育场, Korean: 해란강체육장) is a multi-use stadium in Longjing, Yanbian, Jilin province, China.  It is currently used mostly for football matches.  The stadium holds 32,000 people.

See also
 Sports in China

References

Football venues in China
Sports venues in Jilin
Buildings and structures in Yanbian
Sport in Yanbian